The Greenhorn Mountains are a mountain range of the Southern Sierra Nevada, in California. They are protected within the Sequoia National Forest.

Geography
They are east of the San Joaquin Valley, northeast of Bakersfield, and form the west side of the Kern River Valley.

The lower Kern Canyon is a dramatic and deep canyon cut by the Kern River through the Greenhorn Mountains to the San Joaquin Valley. State Route 178 follows the canyon up to the Kern River Valley.

During the Gold Strike of 1854 miners crossing the Greenhorn Mountains founded the town of Keyesville.

Ecology
The Greenhorn Mountains contain a variety of native California flora and fauna. One wildflower found here is the Yellow mariposa lily (Calochortus luteus), which is at the extreme southern end of its distribution range. The Marsh checkerbloom (Sidalcea ranunculacea) is endemic to the range and adjacent Sierra Nevada foothills.

The Greenhorn Mountains slender salamander (Batrachoseps altasierrae) is endemic to the Greenhorn Mountains.

See also
Kern River Canyon — upper section.

References

 C. Michael Hogan. 2009. Yellow Mariposa Lily: Calochortus luteus, GlobalTwitcher.com, ed. N. Stromberg
 Mildred Brooke Hoover and Douglas E. Kyle. 2002. Historic spots in California, p. 131, 661 pages

External links
USDA Forest Service, Sequoia National Forest:  Greenhorn Mountains  — with map for access and campgrounds.

 
Mountain ranges of the Sierra Nevada (United States)
Mountain ranges of Kern County, California
Mountain ranges of Tulare County, California
Kern River Valley
Sequoia National Forest
Mountain ranges of Northern California
Mountain ranges of Southern California